Joan Taylor (1929–2012) was an American film and television actress.

Joan Taylor may also refer to (chronologically):

 Joan du Plat Taylor (1906–1983), British archaeologist
 Joan Kennedy Taylor (1926–2005), American journalist
 Joan J. Taylor (1940–2019), American archaeologist
 Joan E. Taylor (born 1958), British historian, Professor of Christian Origins and Second Temple Judaism
 Joan Taylor, recording engineer and producer, co-founder of Grosvenor Road Studios